Woman's Wit; or, Loves Disguises is an 1838 comedy play by the Irish writer James Sheridan Knowles.  It premiered at the Theatre Royal, Covent Garden on the 23 June 1838 with a cast that included James Warde as Lord Athunree, George Bartley as Sir William Sutton, William Macready as Walsingham, John Langford Pritchard as Felton, John Pritt Harley as Clever and Helena Faucit as Hero. Knowles dedicated the play to the writer Samuel Rogers.

References

Bibliography
  Burwick, Frederck Goslee, Nancy Moore & Hoeveler Diane Long . The Encyclopaedia of Romantic Literature. John Wiley & Sons,  2012.
 Nicoll, Allardyce. A History of Early Nineteenth Century Drama 1800-1850. Cambridge University Press, 1930.

1838 plays
West End plays
Irish plays
Comedy plays
British plays
Plays by James Sheridan Knowles